Gentiana wingecarribiensis is a flowering plant in the family Gentianaceae and is endemic to New South Wales. It is a small, upright or decumbent annual herb with blue to mauve flowers.

Description 
The stems may be simple or sparingly branched, occasionally up to nine branches each with a single flower, upper surface finely rough, lower surface often with a red or purple tinge. The flowers are borne singly at the end of branches, between 1 and 9 on each plant. The flowers open in response to sunshine and warm temperatures.

Taxonomy and naming
Gentiana wingecarribiensis was first formally described in 1988 by Laurence George Adams and the description was published in Telopea. The specific epithet (wingecarribiensis) is in reference to the swamp where it was originally found.

Distribution and habitat
This gentiana is only known from two locations in the Southern Highlands of New South Wales, it grows in peatland swamps, grasslands and swamp margins.

Conservation status
Gentiana wingecarribiensis is classified as "critically endangered" under the New South Wales Environment Protection and Biodiversity Conservation Act.

References

wingecarribiensis
Flora of New South Wales